Kerala Financial Corporation (KFC) is a government owned non-banking financial company in the state of Kerala, India. The company was formulated by the State Financial Corporations Act of 1951 passed by the Kerala Legislative Assembly to accelerate the industrial growth of the state of Kerala. The corporation was formally founded later, in 1953, as the Travancore Cochin Financial Corporation which was later, in 1956, renamed to Kerala Financial Corporation, following the state's reorganization. As an attempt to boost entrepreneurship in the state, It has offered loans to various SMEs like iTraveller and Veekesy Polymers Pvt Ltd

References 

Companies based in Thiruvananthapuram
State agencies of Kerala
State financial corporations of India
Government finances in Kerala
Indian companies established in 1953
Government agencies established in 1953
Financial services companies established in 1953